The 2017 AAA 400 Drive for Autism was a Monster Energy NASCAR Cup Series race held on June 4, 2017, at Dover International Speedway in Dover, Delaware. Contested over 406 laps, extended from 400 laps due to overtime, on the 1-mile (1.6 km) concrete speedway, it was the 13th race of the 2017 Monster Energy NASCAR Cup Series season.

To date, this race was the 83rd career win for seven-time NASCAR Cup Series champion Jimmie Johnson who retired from full time competition after the 2020 season. Johnson would return in the 2023 Daytona 500

This would also be Ross Chastain and Ryan Sieg's first Cup Series start.

Report

Background

Dover International Speedway is an oval race track in Dover, Delaware, United States that has held at least two NASCAR races since it opened in 1969. In addition to NASCAR, the track also hosted USAC and the Verizon IndyCar Series. The track features one layout, a  concrete oval, with 24° banking in the turns and 9° banking on the straights. The speedway is owned and operated by Dover Motorsports.

The track, nicknamed "The Monster Mile", was built in 1969 by Melvin Joseph of Melvin L. Joseph Construction Company, Inc., with an asphalt surface, but was replaced with concrete in 1995. Six years later in 2001, the track's capacity moved to 135,000 seats, making the track have the largest capacity of sports venue in the mid-Atlantic. In 2002, the name changed to Dover International Speedway from Dover Downs International Speedway after Dover Downs Gaming and Entertainment split, making Dover Motorsports. From 2007 to 2009, the speedway worked on an improvement project called "The Monster Makeover", which expanded facilities at the track and beautified the track. After the 2014 season, the track's capacity was reduced to 95,500 seats.

Entry list

First practice

Qualifying

He said afterwards that it means "a little bit for us (his team)" to go "sit on the pole here" because it grants "a really good pit selection for Sunday" and to boot, "gives us the track position. We know the 78 car (Truex said) is going to be fast – they always are – and one of the guys we’re going to have to race against," Busch added. "There’s going to be many others that are starting farther back that we’ll be racing against, too, before the end of the day, but we’ll work on our Dogs Rule Pedigree Camry tomorrow in practice and make sure we get a good race setup underneath us, so we can hopefully stay up front.”

Qualifying results

Practice (post-qualifying)

Second practice

Final practice

Race

First stage

Kyle Busch led the field to the green flag at 1:19 p.m. The first run of green flag racing lasted just 17 laps before Ryan Sieg went for a solo spin in Turn 2, bringing out the first caution of the race. Ricky Stenhouse Jr. opted not to pit under the caution and assumed the race lead. Exiting pit road, Busch's left-rear tire detached from the car. It was found that one of the airguns the 18 team used to change the tires didn't switch to the setting required to tighten the lug nuts.

Back to green on lap 22, Martin Truex Jr. achieved a better restart and took the lead. Staying out proved costly for Stenhouse on lap 47 when his right-front tire went flat and his car slammed the wall in Turn 3, bringing out a second caution. Kyle Larson took just right-side tires and exited pit road with the race lead. Chase Elliott (speeding) and Denny Hamlin (uncontrolled tire) restarted from the tail-end of the field on the ensuing restart for pit road infractions.

Restarting on lap 52, the race remained green for the next 10 laps before Stenhouse slammed the wall a second time in Turn 4, bringing out the third caution.

On the lap 65 restart, Kurt Busch got loose underneath Larson in Turn 1, overcorrected, turned up the track and slammed into Brad Keselowski, sending him into the wall, bringing out the fourth caution. Keselowski called the incident "one of them racing deals" and the field just "[lined] up double file and somebody got loose and just took us out. What a bummer. Just one of them racing deals."

The race restarted on lap 70. Truex caught Larson five laps later and the two ran side-by-side for four laps. Truex gave Larson a shove heading down the backstretch on lap 80, making Larson loose going into Turn 3 and allowing Truex to take the lead. Busch suffered a left-rear tire blowout, spun out and rear-ended the wall in Turn 1 on lap 96, bringing out the fifth caution. Busch said he "got loose on a restart" and it was his "bad as a driver. We had good speed in our car and just couldn’t finish. You can’t make mistakes out here and we did.”

The race returned to green on lap 104 and Truex won the first stage, bringing out the sixth caution on lap 120 for the end of the stage. Larson opted not to pit and took the lead. Trevor Bayne restarted from the tail-end of the field on the following restart for speeding on pit road.

Second stage
When the race resumed on lap 128, Larson started pulling away from the field. By lap 134, he was two seconds ahead of Matt Kenseth in second. By lap 140, that lead grew to 3.6 seconds. Danica Patrick brought out the seventh caution on lap 144 when she spun out in Turn 4. Michael McDowell took the lead after opting not to pit.

Larson retook the lead with ease on the lap 150 restart. Unlike the short-run, caution-filled first stage, the second stage settled into a green flag lull with 43 straight laps of green flag racing. Larson pulled to a lead of roughly three seconds and held there until caution flew for the eighth time on lap 193 when Joey Logano's right-front tire went flat and he slammed the wall in Turn 3.

Larson spun the tires on the lap 198 restart, but maintained the lead over Truex. As opposed to the last run, Larson drove away from the field, Truex caught Larson on lap 209 and passed him in Turn 1 to take the lead on lap 212. Caution flew for the ninth time on lap 219 when Landon Cassill's right-front tire went flat and his car slammed the wall in Turn 2. Truex exited pit road with the race lead, while Larson exited 19th.

The race resumed on lap 222 and Truex won the second stage, and caution flew for the 10th time for the conclusion of the stage. Larson took just right-side tires and exited pit road with the race lead. Ryan Blaney broke a rear axle on the pit stop and took his car to the garage. He returned to the race two laps down.

Final stage

Two laps after the lap 248 restart, Truex got loose and lost second to Jimmie Johnson. Debris on the frontstretch brought out the 11th caution on lap 263.

Resuming green flag conditions with 132 laps to go, the race remained green long enough for a cycle of green flag pit stops with 75 to go. Larson pitted from the lead the following lap, handing it to Johnson. Regan Smith, driving in place of the injured Aric Almirola, slammed the wall in Turn 2 after his right-front tire went flat bringing out the 12th caution. Ty Dillon exited pit road with the race lead.

The race returned to green with 65 to go. Exiting Turn 2 with 58 to go, Chris Buescher got loose and into Paul Menard, sending him into the inside wall on the backstretch, bringing out the 13th caution.

The race restarted with 52 to go. Larson powered by Johnson on his outside in Turn 1 to take second with 42 to go, and passed Dillon on the high-side to take the lead with 39 to go. Johnson passed Dillon to take second and cut Larson's lead to just around a second. But as the laps started to wind down, Larson increased the gap and had the race in check. The lead he built up evaporated when David Ragan suffered a right-front tire blowout and slammed the wall in Turn 2 with four laps to go, bringing out the 14th caution and set up an overtime finish. Ragan's wreck laid oil all down the backstretch and NASCAR had to apply speedy-dry to clean it up.

Overtime
The race restarted in overtime with two to go. Johnson achieved a superior restart to Larson and took the lead. Dillon got loose exiting Turn 2 and came down across the nose of Ryan Newman. His car turned back up track and was t-boned by Erik Jones, triggering a multi-car wreck on the backstretch and bringing out the final caution. Johnson had crossed the overtime line, located on the backstretch at the R of Dover, and was in Turn 3 when the caution ended the race and was declared the winner.

Race results

Stage results

Stage 1
Laps: 120

Stage 2
Laps: 120

Final stage results

Stage 3
Laps: 166

Race statistics
 Lead changes: 9 among different drivers
 Cautions/Laps: 15 for 72
 Red flags: 0
 Time of race: 3 hours, 52 minutes and 6 seconds
 Average speed:

Media

Television
Fox Sports covered their 17th race at the Dover International Speedway. Mike Joy, five-time Dover winner Jeff Gordon and two-time Dover winner Darrell Waltrip had the call in the booth for the race. Jamie Little, Vince Welch and Matt Yocum handled the action on pit road for the television side.

Radio
MRN had the radio call for the race which was also simulcasted on Sirius XM NASCAR Radio.

Standings after the race

Drivers' Championship standings

Manufacturers' Championship standings

Note: Only the first 16 positions are included for the driver standings.
. – Driver has clinched a position in the Monster Energy NASCAR Cup Series playoffs.

References

AAA 400 Drive for Autism
AAA 400 Drive for Autism
Sociological and cultural aspects of autism
AAA 400 Drive for Autism
NASCAR races at Dover Motor Speedway